William Dorsheimer House is a historic home located at Buffalo in Erie County, New York, that was listed on the National Register of Historic Places in 1980.

History
It was designed and built in 1868 by Henry Hobson Richardson (1838–1886) for William Dorsheimer (1832–1888), prominent local lawyer and Lieutenant Governor of New York.  It is a -story brick dwelling and represents the profound influence of French ideas on the arts in the post Civil War period.

Design
The three-story building is of a relatively simple design featuring incised decorations of rosettes and triglyphs.  The house features horizontal bands of gray sandstone across the ochre brick facade and vertical stone at the buildings corners. The windows on the structure are framed by vertical bands of the same gray sandstone and are in perpendicular rows. The mansard roof is made of slate and features large dormers.

It was listed on the National Register of Historic Places in 1980.

H. H. Richardson
The Dorsheimer home was the first Richardson building in Buffalo and proved to be a significant commission in Richardson's career as it led to some of Richardson's greatest achievements. In 1877, while Dorsheimer was Lieutenant Governor of New York, Richardson was commissioned, along with Frederick Law Olmsted and Leopold Eidlitz, to complete the New York State Capitol and later, Albany City Hall.

Also in Buffalo, Richardson designed the Buffalo State Hospital (in 1870), and the William Gratwick House (1886-1888). The Gratwick House was a few blocks north of the Dorsheimer House, at the corner of Delaware and Summer, but was torn down in 1919.

Today
The interior has been completely remodeled to allow for commercial use and one main, open-well stairway remains. The stairway extends from the first floor (north entrance) to the third floor. The staircase appears to have been moved to the north to allow for additional space in the rooms to the south.

Gallery

See also

Architecture of Buffalo, New York
William Dorsheimer
Henry Hobson Richardson

References

External links
Dorsheimer, William, House - U.S. National Register of Historic Places on Waymarking.com

Henry Hobson Richardson buildings
Houses on the National Register of Historic Places in New York (state)
Historic American Buildings Survey in New York (state)
Houses completed in 1868
Houses in Buffalo, New York
Architecture of Buffalo, New York
National Register of Historic Places in Buffalo, New York